Wedel station (officially Wedel (Holst), meaning Wedel in Holstein) is a railway station on the Altona-Blankenese line, served by the rapid transit trains of the Hamburg S-Bahn, located in Wedel, Germany.

It is a terminus of the line S1.

History
The station was opened on 1 December 1883. The station was then served by four steam trains a day, the number increased to 16 by 1904. During World War II, on 3 March 1943, bombs heavily damaged the station building, which was rebuilt after the war, but demolished in the 1980s for a new car park and bus stop.

Electrification of the railway line was planned since 1948. It was completed in May 1950 to Sülldorf. On 20 May 1954 the electrified track to Wedel was opened.

Station layout
The station is an at-grade terminus with one platform and two tracks. There is no service personnel attending the station, but an SOS and information telephone is available. There are several places to lock a bicycle as well as a Park and ride car park. The station is fully accessible for handicapped persons. Also a public toilet and a taxi stand can be found near the station. A shopping arcade is located in the station entrance. There are no lockerboxes.

Service
Trains of S1 line serve the station. A bus stop is located near the station, which is served by bus lines 189, 289, 389, 489, 589, and night bus lines 601, and 621.

See also
Hamburger Verkehrsverbund

References

External links

DB station information 

Hamburg S-Bahn stations in Schleswig-Holstein
Railway stations in Germany opened in 1883
Buildings and structures in Pinneberg (district)